Fisciano is a town and comune in the province of Salerno in the Campania region of south-western Italy. It is dominated by the University of Salerno, which built a new campus in the town in 1988.
The municipality borders with Baronissi, Calvanico, Castiglione del Genovesi, Giffoni Sei Casali, Mercato San Severino and Montoro.

Economy
The economy is based on agriculture and animal husbandry; the traditional copper working activities ceased in the 1980s, although there are some industrial plants (metal-working/ mechanics, glass and plastics sectors).

Transport
Fisciano is served by a railway station on the line Salerno-Mercato San Severino.

See also
University of Salerno

References

External links

Cities and towns in Campania